Ionopsis (violet orchid) is a genus of flowering plants from the orchid family, Orchidaceae. It contains 6 currently accepted species, native to Latin America, the West Indies, and Florida.

Ionopsis burchellii Rchb.f. - Brazil
Ionopsis minutiflora (Dodson & N.H.Williams) Pupulin - Ecuador
Ionopsis papillosa Pupulin - Ecuador
Ionopsis satyrioides (Sw.) Rchb.f. in W.G.Walpers - widespread across southern Mexico, Central America, the West Indies, and South America
Ionopsis utricularioides (Sw.) Lindl. - widespread across southern Mexico, Central America, the West Indies, South America, and Florida
Ionopsis zebrina Kraenzl. - Colombia

See also 
 List of Orchidaceae genera

References

External links 

Oncidiinae genera
Oncidiinae